The Devonshire is a historic apartment building located at Indianapolis, Indiana.  It was built in 1929, and is a three-story, three bay by nine bay, Tudor Revival style brown wire cut brick building.  It features a recessed central entrance bay, limestone arched entrance, and brick and stone checkerwork at the third floor level.

It was listed on the National Register of Historic Places in 1983.

References

Apartment buildings in Indiana
Residential buildings on the National Register of Historic Places in Indiana
Tudor Revival architecture in Indiana
Residential buildings completed in 1929
Residential buildings in Indianapolis
National Register of Historic Places in Indianapolis